Tripuri Nationalism is an ideology that supports self-determination by the Tripuri people. The conflict is in essence ethnic and the Tripuri community, indigenous to the region formed the clear majority of population in the princely state of Tippera, which joined the Republic of India in 1949 as the state of Tripura.

The issue has led to a number of armed uprisings and Insurgency in Tripura.
There was a rebellion in 1950, and armed conflict continued to erupt in the 1980s to 2000s. Since 1989, the armed rebellion was mostly led by the National Liberation Front of Tripura (NLFT) and the All Tripura Tiger Force ATTF).
The Bengali side retaliated by forming militias of their own, such as the United Bengali Liberation Tiger Front (UBLTF), which destroyed a number of Tripuri villages in 2000.

The NLFT is classified by the National Memorial Institute for the Prevention of Terrorism as one of the ten most active terrorist groups in the world, and has been accused of forcefully converting people to Christianity.

Militant activity peaked in 2000 with 514 terrorism-related fatalities in that year. As of 2012, the uprising has largely been brought under control by the authorities through security actions and negotiated surrenders.

Organisations and militant groups

Tripuri political organizations and militant groups include:
All Tripura Tiger Force
National Liberation Front of Tripura

See also
Tripura Tribal Areas Autonomous District Council
Tripura rebellion
Naga nationalism
Tamil nationalism
Insurgency in North-East India
Assamese nationalism
Assam movement 
United Liberation Front of Axom   
Assam conflict

References

External links

 
Separatism in India
1980s conflicts
1990s conflicts
2000s conflicts